Mark Charles Edward Wright (born 20 January 1987) is an English television personality, football pundit, entertainment reporter, and professional footballer who last played for  side Crawley Town. He is best known for appearing as a cast member on the first three series of The Only Way Is Essex. Wright gained more popularity after appearing on the eleventh series of I'm a Celebrity...Get Me Out of Here! where he finished as runner-up, and the twelfth series of Strictly Come Dancing, where he finished in fourth place.

He is also a current presenter on Heart's Saturday afternoon slot.

Career

Football
Before his appearances on The Only Way Is Essex, Wright was a semi-professional footballer, with a youth career at West Ham United, Arsenal, and Tottenham Hotspur.

He started his senior career with Southend United, but moved into nightclub promoting and playing only semi-professionally. In November 2006, he was loaned from Grays Athletic to fellow Conference National side Crawley Town. On 27 January 2007, he scored the only goal of a 1–0 win at Tamworth. In March that year, he was lent to Rushden & Diamonds for the rest of the season. Wright played once for the England national football C team, playing in a defeat to Bosnia and Herzegovina B on 16 September 2008.

In January 2012, it was reported that he rekindled his semi-professional footballing career, by signing for St Neots Town, but this was denied by Wright on his Twitter account.

Wright made his return to professional football on 14 December 2020, signing for League Two side Crawley Town on a non-contract basis. He made his professional debut at the age of 33 in the third round of the FA Cup, coming on as a 90th minute substitute as Crawley won 3–0 against Premier League side Leeds United on 10 January 2021. His brother, Josh, also played in the match, having signed for Crawley in January 2021. Wright made his first professional start in League Two against Harrogate Town on 6 February, and was substituted at half time in a 3–1 home loss. He was released by Crawley at the end of the 2020–21 season.

Television
In October 2010, Wright was one of the original cast members in the ITV reality programme The Only Way is Essex. He announced his departure from the show on 23 October 2011, near the end of the third series. He later returned for a cameo appearance in the sixth series and also, for the 2012 Christmas special. He briefly returned again in 2014 and again in 2016.

In November 2011, Wright took part in the eleventh series of I'm a Celebrity...Get Me Out of Here!. He was the runner-up, losing to McFly bassist Dougie Poynter.

From January 2012 until 2017, Wright and Laura Jackson co-presented the Take Me Out spin-off programme Take Me Out: The Gossip for ITV2. Zoe Hardman previously hosted with Wright. The series did not air in 2018. He also appeared as a fitness expert on the ITV Breakfast programme  Daybreak for two weeks, to front its mini series Downsize in Dubai.

From 20 June to 7 July 2012, Wright presented and starred in a new ITV2 show, titled Mark Wright's Hollywood Nights. It was later dropped after one series. He was due to co-present with Melanie Sykes on a new entertainment series named My Man Can. After filming one series, ITV made the decision not to air the show.

Since 2013, Wright was a reporter on the ITV series Surprise Surprise.

In 2014, Wright fronted his own ITV2 reality show entitled Party Wright Around The World. In 2014, Wright was one of the celebrities competing in the twelfth series of Strictly Come Dancing. He was paired up with professional dancer Karen Hauer. The couple made into the final in which they came fourth.

Wright also presented The Dengineers with Lauren Layfield on CBBC from 2015 until 2017. He left at the end of the second series and was replaced by Joe Tracini.

In December 2016, Wright made an appearance on an episode of E!'s The Royals (season 3, episode 1).

Wright presented on the American entertainment news programme EXTRA by Warner Bros from 2017 to 2020.

Wright presents series 6 of Channel 5's The Bachelor, based on the US television show of the same name.

On 5 July 2019, Wright guest presented This Morning with Rochelle Humes. Wright starred in the BBC programme Who Do You Think You Are? in September 2019.

In January 2021, Wright featured in a BBC iPlayer mini-series, Mark Wright: The Last Chance, about his efforts to revive his professional football career with Crawley Town.

Radio
Since 24 December 2012, Wright has presented the "Club Classics" show every Friday and Saturday evening on Heart Radio, between 7pm and 9pm. He left in December 2017 when he moved to the United States, and returned to the station in July 2019. In March 2020, after the defection of Sian Welby to Capital FM, he took up the Monday to Thursday evening slot at the station.

In December 2021, he left the Monday-Thursday evening slot with Dev Griffin taking over at the start of the new year. He now presents the Saturday early evening show from 4-7pm.

Other work
In June 2013, Wright was signed by online retail giant, Littlewoods, as its new face of menswear, which sees him style and model a capsule collection each season for Littlewoods' own-brand menswear line, Goodsouls. In September 2018 he was signed by Matalan as the face of their menswear range.

In June 2016, he took part in Soccer Aid for the first time. He played for 'England'. He scored a goal from a direct free kick in the 3–2 victory, and was named Man of the Match. Wright also played in the 2018 and 2019 editions of Soccer Aid.

Personal life
Mark is the son of Carol and Mark Wright, Sr, and the brother of fellow professional footballer Josh Wright, whom he played alongside at Crawley Town, and fellow The Only Way is Essex cast member Jess Wright. He has a younger sister.

On 22 February 2009, Wright was best man at the wedding of the reality star Jade Goody and Jack Tweed, as he was a childhood friend of the groom. Footage of the ceremony was shown in the Sky Living series Jade: The Reality Star Who Changed Britain in 2019. In August 2011, Wright appeared at Redbridge Magistrates' Court charged with using threatening behaviour on a night out. He was found not guilty, while Tweed pleaded guilty to common assault.

Wright was in a relationship with fellow TOWIE cast member Lauren Goodger. Since December 2012, Wright has been in a relationship with former Coronation Street actress Michelle Keegan. They married on 24 May 2015.

In December 2021, Wright underwent an operation to remove a 12 cm tumour.

According to Who Do You Think You Are?, Mark's great-great-grandfather was of Jewish heritage, and his nine-times great grandfather, David Antonio de Mendoza, was a converso of Sephardic Jewish descent who was arrested by the Spanish Inquisition in 1696 accused of secretly practising his ancestors' religion. David, who was 36 at the time, was tortured for two years in Seville using methods including the toca. Once out of prison, David moved his family to Amsterdam where it was safe to practise their faith. His nephew Miguel, however, returned to Spain and was burned at the stake.

Politics
Wright is a supporter of the Conservative Party and had previously called for people to support then-Prime Minister Theresa May, plus endorsing Shaun Bailey for the 2021 London Mayoral election.

Career statistics

Filmography

See also
 List of I'm a Celebrity...Get Me Out of Here! (British TV series) contestants
 List of Strictly Come Dancing contestants

References

External links

1987 births
Living people
People from Buckhurst Hill
Sportspeople from Essex
People from Brentwood, Essex
English male television actors
English male models
English television personalities
English footballers
England semi-pro international footballers
National League (English football) players
Isthmian League players
Tottenham Hotspur F.C. players
Southend United F.C. players
Lewes F.C. players
Grays Athletic F.C. players
Crawley Town F.C. players
Rushden & Diamonds F.C. players
St Albans City F.C. players
Bishop's Stortford F.C. players
Fisher Athletic F.C. players
Thurrock F.C. players
Heart (radio network)
Television personalities from Essex
Heybridge Swifts F.C. players
Association football defenders
Entertainment journalists
English people of Spanish-Jewish descent
I'm a Celebrity...Get Me Out of Here! (British TV series) participants
English Football League players